Aaron Anderson (born 25 September 2000), is an Australian professional soccer player who plays as a central defender for Altona Magic in NPL Victoria.

Club career
On 8 May 2019, he made his professional debut for Melbourne Victory against Daegu FC in the 2019 AFC Champions League.

Honours

Club

Melbourne Victory
FFA Cup: 2021

References

External links

2000 births
Living people
Australian soccer players
Association football defenders
Melbourne Victory FC players
National Premier Leagues players